The Rosentopf Case (German: Der Fall Rosentopf) is a 1918 German silent comedy film directed by Ernst Lubitsch and starring Lubitsch, Trude Hesterberg and Margarete Kupfer.

It was shot at the Tempelhof Studios in Berlin. The film's sets were designed by the art directors Paul Leni and Kurt Richter.

Cast
 Ernst Lubitsch as Sally, junger Mann des Detektiv Ceeps 
 Trude Hesterberg as Bella Spaketti, Tänzerin 
 Ferry Sikla as Rentier Klingelmann 
 Margarete Kupfer as Dienstmädchen 
 Elsa Wagner as Frau Hintze

References

Bibliography
 Kristin Thompson. Herr Lubitsch Goes to Hollywood: German and American Film After World War I. Amsterdam University Press, 2005.

External links

1918 films
Films of the German Empire
German silent feature films
Films directed by Ernst Lubitsch
German comedy films
1918 comedy films
UFA GmbH films
Films shot at Tempelhof Studios
German black-and-white films
Silent comedy films
1910s German films